The 2015 Uzbek League was the 24th season of top level football in Uzbekistan since independence in 1992. Pakhtakor were the defending champions from the 2014 campaign.

Teams

Sogdiana Jizzakh and FK Andijan remained for 2015 Uzbek League edition due decision of UzPFL to expand League to 16 teams from 2015 season. Shurtan Guzar and Kokand 1912 promoted to 2015 League as 2014 First League winner and runner-up.

Managerial changes

League table

Results

Relegation play-off
The one leg relegation play-off match between 15th placed team of Uzbek League, Sogdiana Jizzakh and runners-up of 2015 First League, Oqtepa was played on 25 November 2015 in Olmaliq. Sogdiana won by 2:1 and remained in League.

Season statistics

Top goalscorers

Last updated: 22 November 2015
Source: Soccerway

Hat–tricks

Awards

Monthly awards

References

External links
Uzbekistan PFL - Official League Site 

Uzbekistan Super League seasons
1
Uzbek
Uzbek